Tato is census town in the Indian state of Arunachal Pradesh. It serves as district headquarter of newly created Shi Yomi district.

Tato Town is 201 km from state capital Itanagar.

References 

Cities and towns in West Siang district
Hill stations in Arunachal Pradesh
Arunachal Pradesh geography stubs